Friedsam is a surname. Notable people with the surname include:

Anna-Lena Friedsam (born 1994), German tennis player
Michael Friedsam (1860–1931), American philanthropist